Tjønnholstinden or Tjørnholstind is a mountain in Vågå Municipality in Innlandet county, Norway. The mountain is surrounded by several other notable mountains including Bukkehåmåren, Høgdebrotet, and Eggi to the northeast; Rasletinden to the southeast; Tjønnholsoksle to the south; Skarvflytindene and Leirungstinden to the southwest; and Surtningssue to the north.

The mountain lies south of the lake Gjende and north of the Leirungsdalen valley. On the northern side of the mountain, there is a  vertical drop down to the Nordre Tjønnholet glacier. The mountain has two peaks with a narrow ridge between. The lower eastern summit is named Steinflytind. The mountain and both peaks are easily accessible from both west and east.

Name
The first element is the genitive of the name of the gorge Tjønnholet. The last element is the finite form of tind which means 'mountain peak'. The name of the gorge is a compound of tjønn which means 'tarn' or 'small lake' and the finite form of hol which means 'hole', 'hollow', or 'gorge'. There are actually two gorges with the name Tjønnholet here: Nørdre Tjønnholet north of the peak - and Søre Tjønnholet south of the peak.

See also
List of mountains of Norway by height

References

Jotunheimen
Vågå
Mountains of Innlandet